Augustin Călin may refer to:

 Augustin Călin (footballer) (born 1973), Romanian football player
 Augustin Călin (football manager) (born 1980), Romanian football manager